Danley Jean Jacques (born 20 May 2000) is a Haitian professional footballer who plays as a midfielder for Metz.

Career
Jean Jacques is a youth product of the Haitian club Don Bosco, and began his senior career with them in 2015 making 52 appearances with them, scoring 7 goals. He moved to the reserves of Metz in August 2021. On 7 June 2022, he signed a professional contract with Metz keeping him at the club until June 2024. He made his professional debut with Metz in a 3–0 Ligue 2 win over Amiens on 30 July 2022.

International career
Jean Jacques is a youth international for Haiti, having represented them from the Haiti U17s to the U21s. He was called up to the senior Haiti national team in March 2022.

References

External links
 
 

2000 births
Living people
People from Ouest (department)
Haitian footballers
Haiti youth international footballers
Don Bosco FC players
FC Metz players
Ligue Haïtienne players
Ligue 2 players
Championnat National 2 players
Association football midfielders
Haitian expatriate footballers
Haitian expatriates in France
Expatriate footballers in France